Defense of Tsaritsyn may refer to:
 The Battle of Tsaritsyn during the Russian Civil War
 The Defense of Tsaritsyn, a 1942 Soviet film about that battle